Julie McWhirter, also known as Julie Dees and Julie McWhirter-Dees (born October 12, 1947), is a retired American voice actress and impressionist best known for her work as Jeannie in the animated version of Jeannie, Bubbles in Jabberjaw and Baby Smurf and Sassette in The Smurfs.

Biography

McWhirter graduated from DePauw University in 1970, with a degree in speech. She studied acting and improvisational comedy under the guidance of Howard Storm and Charles Conrad.

One of her first voice roles was as the title character in Jeannie, alongside Mark Hamill, Bob Hastings and Joe Besser. She also portrayed the character in her multiple appearances in other Hanna-Barbera series.
She did the voice of Kanga in Winnie the Pooh and a Day for Eeyore, taking over the role from Barbara Luddy. Her voice acting also includes numerous other animated programs, such as  Casper and the Angels, Drak Pack, The Smurfs, The Flintstone Kids, and the Ruby-Spears series Thundarr the Barbarian.

McWhirter made her stage debut as Eliza Doolittle in the Lawrence Theatre production of My Fair Lady. She dubbed the singing voice for Blousey Brown in the film Bugsy Malone. The actress was also one of the hosts of the 1977 sketch comedy series Wacko. She portrayed Betty Rubble in The Jetsons Meet the Flintstones TV movie and was the voice of Huckleberry Pie in the 1980s Strawberry Shortcake specials.

She has been married to disc jockey Rick Dees since 1977.

Filmography

Animated series

Television live-action appearances

Animated film

References

External links
 

Living people
American voice actresses
American impressionists (entertainers)
American stage actresses
American television actresses
20th-century American actresses
21st-century American actresses
American women comedians
DePauw University alumni
Hanna-Barbera people
20th-century American comedians
21st-century American comedians
1947 births